Miss Polski 2014 was the 25th Miss Polski pageant, held on December 7, 2014. The winner was Ewa Mielnicka of Masovia. Mielnicka represented Poland in both Miss International 2015 and Miss Supranational 2016.

Final results

Special Awards

Judges
Ewa Wachowicz - Miss Polonia 1992, 3rd Runner-Up Miss World 1992, Judge of Top Chef Poland
Paweł Królikowski - Actor
Krzysztof Gojdź - Doctor and Lecturer at the American Academy of Aesthetic Medicine
Rafał Maślak - Mister Polski 2014
Viola Piekut - Designer
Katarzyna Juryk - President of Humaneo
Stanisław Karpiel-Bułecka - Vocalist of the band Future Folk
Łukasz Jemioł - Designer
Dorota Czaja-Bilska - Actress, Dancer
Robert Czepiel - CEO of Jubiler Schubert
Gerhard Parzutka von Lipiński - President of the Miss Polski competition
Lech Daniłowicz - President of the Missland Company
Robert Woźniak - Director of Szewczyk Auto VW / Audi

Finalists

Notes

Withdrawals
 Lower Poland
 Opole

Did not compete
 Subcarpathia
 Polish Community in Argentina
 Polish Community in Australia
 Polish Community in Belarus
 Polish Community in Brazil
 Polish Community in Canada
 Polish Community in France
 Polish Community in Germany
 Polish Community in Ireland
 Polish Community in Israel
 Polish Community in Lithuania
 Polish Community in Russia
 Polish Community in South Africa
 Polish Community in Sweden
 Polish Community in the U.K.
 Polish Community in the U.S.
 Polish Community in Venezuela

References

External links
Official Website

2014
2014 beauty pageants
2014 in Poland